Tranmere is a suburb of Birkenhead, Wirral, Merseyside, England.  It contains seven buildings that are recorded in the National Heritage List for England as designated listed buildings, all of which are listed at Grade II.  This grade is the lowest of the three gradings given to listed buildings and is applied to "buildings of national importance and special interest".  The area is partly residential and partly industrial.  The listed buildings consist of two churches, a house, a cross shaft, and a drinking fountain.

References

Citations

Sources

Listed buildings in Merseyside
Lists of listed buildings in Merseyside